Joby Harold is an English screenwriter, producer and director who runs Safehouse Pictures with his producing partner, Tory Tunnell. The company was co-founded in 2005.

Career 
Harold's latest projects are the upcoming films Space Mountain  and Atlas starring Jennifer Lopez, Simu Liu, and Sterling K. Brown both of which he will be producing alongside Tunnell. He is also working on the new Untitled Godzilla Project with Legendary starring Kurt Russell, Wyatt Russell, Ren Watabe, Anna Sawai, and Kiersey Clemons. Harold is developing the movie I.F.  with Mike Mitchell attached to direct and Tiffany Haddish set to star.

Recently, he wrote and Executive Produced the series Obi-Wan Kenobi for Disney+ and also worked on Transformers: Rise of the Beasts, the last in the live action Transformers film series, for Paramount Pictures as a sequel to Bumblebee, along with a sci-fi thriller Cloaker for Warner Bros., which Safehouse Pictures is producing. Previously, he executive produced John Wick: Chapter 3 – Parabellum, after writing on John Wick: Chapter 2. He also executive produced Edge of Tomorrow for Doug Liman, starring Tom Cruise and Emily Blunt as well as co-writing King Arthur: Legend of the Sword starring Charlie Hunnam and Jude Law, which he and Tory Tunnell produced under their Safehouse banner. He also wrote a draft for the upcoming superhero movie The Flash, as part of the DC Extended Universe which Matthew Vaughn and Robert Zemeckis were formally circling to direct, followed by Sam Raimi, Marc Webb, and Phil Lord and Chris Miller. He recently co-wrote the zombie movie Army of the Dead, alongside director Zack Snyder and Shay Hatten, which was released on Netflix in May 2021.

His company Safehouse Pictures is producing several projects including the Battle of Britain for director Ridley Scott, Liberators with Michael B. Jordan attached to star, Patricia Arquette’s directorial debut Love Canal, and the feature adaptation of Space Invaders. In television, Harold produced the female drama Spinning Out at Netflix, starring January Jones and Kaya Scodelario. She previously was a partner with Weed Road Pictures, until they struck a deal with Sony in 2015.

He previously executive produced the WGN series Underground. Harold broke into a business in 2005, writing and directing the film Awake for The Weinstein Company, starring Hayden Christensen, Jessica Alba, Terrence Howard and Lena Olin, which Tunnell also produced.

Filmography

Film 

Executive producer
 Edge of Tomorrow (2014)
 My Blind Brother (2016)
 Robin Hood (2018)
 John Wick: Chapter 3 – Parabellum (2019)

Television

References 

 https://variety.com/2020/film/news/transformers-franchise-revamp-bumblebee-james-vanderbilt-joby-harold-1203482496/

External links

Living people
Year of birth missing (living people)
Writers from London
English screenwriters
English male screenwriters
English film producers
English film directors
Skydance Media people